Wolfram-like syndrome is a rare autosomal dominant genetic disorder which shares some of the features shown by those affected with the autosomal recessive Wolfram syndrome. It is a type of WFS1-related disorder.

Signs and symptoms 
 
Individuals with this condition usually exhibit early-onset progressive hearing loss which starts around the age of 10 years old, early-onset optic atrophy which usually manifests in a person's mid teenage–late adulthood years of life, and adult-onset diabetes mellitus.
 
Although rarely, psychiatric symptoms can also manifest in people with the condition, this group of symptoms consists of hallucinations, depression, anxiety, and sleep disorders.Psychosis and autism are sometimes seen as features of the disorder. 
 
Other symptoms include nephrocalcinosis, psychomotor delay, glaucoma, and megalocornea.

Complications 
 
The psychiatric features that may appear in patients with this condition, particularly depression, can cause a patient to be live in a constantly miserable state of mind, which can lead some patients to develop suicidal tendencies and, which can ultimately lead to making the decision of committing suicide.

Genetics 
 
This condition is caused by mutations in the WFS1 gene, these mutations are inherited in an autosomal dominant manner, meaning that for a person to exhibit the symptoms of Wolfram-like syndrome, they must have at least one copy of the mutation that is responsible for the phenotype of the disorder, this mutation is usually inherited, but there are cases where the mutation is de novo, meaning that it wasn't inherited from either parent, but rather the result of a spontaneous error in cell division.
 
This gene encodes a protein called wolframin, the mutations typically found in people with this condition cause the production of a protein that is either absent or has little to no function at all.
 
Mutations in this gene are also associated with other disorders affecting vision or hearing, (aside from Wolfram syndrome) such as non-syndromic autosomal dominant deafness type 6., isolated autosomal dominant congenital cataract, etc.
 
In rare cases, a mutation in the CDK13 gene instead of the WFS1 gene is responsible for the disorder, this genetic mutation has only been described in 3 affected children belonging to a consanguineous Pakistani family who, in addition to the typical symptoms of the disorder, also had anomalies affecting the gastrointestinal tract, congenital heart defects, and clinodactyly.

Diagnosis 
 
The following diagnostic methods can be used to diagnose Wolfram-like syndrome

Genetic mutation responsible for Wolfram-like syndrome 
 
Genetic testing
Whole exome sequencing
Whole genome sequencing
Gene sequencing focused on the WFS1 gene

Diabetes 
 
Blood tests
Blood sugar test at a random time
Fasting blood sugar test
A1C test
Oral glucose tolerance testing

Hearing loss 
 
At-home
Hearing loss screening mobile apps
Whisper test
In clinical setting
Audiometer tests
Tuning fork test
Physical examination

Optic atrophy 
 
Ophthalmoscopy
Optic disc examination, paleness strongly indicates optic atrophy
Visual acuity examination

Psychiatric symptoms

Depression 
 
Use of the DSM-5 depression diagnosis criteria
Physical examination
Laboratory studies
Psychiatric evaluation

Anxiety 
 
Use of the DSM-5 criteria for anxiety disorder
Psychological evaluation

Hallucinations (with or without delusions and/or disconnection from reality) 
 
Hallucinations don't necessarily need to have an official clinical diagnosis (although one can be useful for treatment to be performed), but it can be used as a diagnostic method for other conditions such as psychosis or schizophrenia. Hallucinations can be auditory, visual, tactile, olfactory, or gustatory, and they involve a false perception of stimuli where there is none. The same (no necessary need for official clinical diagnosis but can be used as a diagnostic method for other conditions) goes for delusions, there are various types of delusions, including somatic, persecutory/paranoid, grandiose, etc. They involve a false, fixed, often irrational belief a person fully believes in and is hard to convince out of.

Treatment 

There is no standard management method for Wolfram-like syndrome, however, the following treatment methods can be used to treat the symptoms Wolfram-like syndrome causes.

Diabetes 

Insulin intake
Regular blood sugar monitoring
The use of metformin medication
Healthy eating habits
Regular physical activity

Hearing loss 
 
Hearing aids
Cochlear implants
Surgical procedures

Vision loss 
 
Optical aids
Surgical procedures
Medication

Psychiatric symptoms 
 
Therapy (for depression, anxiety, etc.)
Use of medication (antidepressants, antipsychotics, etc.)

Prevalence 
 
According to OMIM, around 15-20 cases from 4 affected families with Wolfram-like syndrome have been described in medical lirerature. All of the families studied were European, both by ancestry and by nacionality, the countries said families originated from were Denmark, the Netherlands, France, and Sweden, respectively.

History 

The disorder was seemingly first described in 1940 by Samuelson et al., their patients were 4 members from a Swedish family with an apparently never-described-before combination of autosomal dominant sensorineural deafness and optic atrophy. Said family was later re-examined in 2011 by Rendtorff et al.

In 2006, Eiberg et al. described 4 affected members from a 3-generation Danish family, said individuals showed a phenotype similar to that shown by patients with Wolfram syndrome, the pair of symptoms associated with the family's unique disorder was inherited following an autosomal dominant manner. All individuals had progressive hearing loss starting in childhood and optic atrophy with onset in either childhood or middle age. 3 out of the 4 individuals were found to have irregular glucose regulation, 1 had reduced glucose tolerance, another one was found to have diabetes which was previously undiagnosed, and yet another one of the patients was found to have decreased function of the pancreas' beta cells. 1 out of the 4 individuals had a diagnosed anxiety disorder as well as a sleep disorder. Non-syndromic isolated congenital deafness was found in 2 other family members, although they were otherwise unaffected.

The third case report was made by Valero et al. in 2008, they described a 60-year-old man and his 81-year-old mother from France. The both of them had noninsulin-dependent diabetes mellitus and childhood-onset hearing loss. Out of the 2 patients, the mother was the most affected, her phenotype consisted of additional features her son didn't suffer from including severe vision impairment, bilateral optic nerve atrophy. Even though both of them had hearing impairments, the son was the only one of the pair who wore a hearing aid, the mother didn't do so, and as a result she had very obvious difficulties comprehending speech.

The fourth case report was made by Hogewind et al., their patients were 3 affected members of a 2-generation Dutch family (2 brothers and their mother). The three of them suffered from hearing loss ranging from moderate to severe and optic neuropathy but they didn't have any other symptoms, including the ones usually associated with both Wolfram syndrome and Wolfram-like syndrome (such as diabetes mellitus/insipidus or depression), but they did have red-green color deficiency. The elder sibling and the mother were found to have severe hearing loss which heavily diminished their ability at recognizing speech, while the younger brother was relatively okay at doing so. All three individuals were found to have ocular scotoma (also known as blind spot) and neuroretinal rim loss. They were the only affected people with the disorder in their family.

The fifth case report was a re-examination of the Swedish family reported in 1940 by Samuelson et al. The phenotypical variability rate among affected family members was found to be high. Additional details were revealed in this reexamination of the family; the proband of the original study (whom had been long dead) was found to not only suffer from the typical deafness-visual  impairment phenotype commonly associated with the syndrome, but they also had hallucinations and depression. 4 of their other family members had underwent therapy for anxiety and 1 of their family members had died as a result of suicide. Visual/ocular features included optic atrophy which resulted in progressively lower visual acuity among those with the condition and glaucoma, which was highly treatable.

Relation with Wolfram syndrome 

Although both conditions are caused by a mutation in the WFS1 gene, they have different phenotypical features and different inheritance patterns, for example; while Wolfram syndrome tends to follow an autosomal recessive inheritance pattern, Wolfram-like syndrome follows an autosomal dominant inheritance pattern. Symptoms are another example of the difference between Wolfram syndrome and Wolfram-like syndrome; intellectual disabilities, ataxia, anosmia, ageusia, and/or sleep apnea, alongside other cardiac and/or endocrine symptoms are features that, while present in some to most cases of Wolfram syndrome, are absent in those with Wolfram-like syndrome, onset of certain symptoms also differs between patients with Wolfram syndrome and patients with Wolfram-like syndrome. Hearing impairments aren't present in every person with Wolfram-like syndrome either. Wolfram-like syndrome is also known to be less severe than Wolfram syndrome itself.

See also 

Delusional disorder

References 

Rare diseases
Genetic diseases and disorders